Pedrolia Martin Sikayun  (born 18 February 1992) is a Malaysian women's international footballer who plays as a midfielder. She is a member of the Malaysia women's national football team. She was part of the team at the 2016 AFF Women's Championship. At a club level she played for MISC-MIFA in Malaysia.

References

1992 births
Living people
Malaysian women's footballers
Malaysia women's international footballers
Place of birth missing (living people)
Women's association football midfielders
Competitors at the 2019 Southeast Asian Games
Southeast Asian Games competitors for Malaysia